Karthok Monastery is a Buddhist monastery in Pakyong, a town in the foothills of the Himalayas located in the East Sikkim district of the northeastern Indian state of Sikkim. It is considered  the sixth oldest monastery of Sikkim and this monastery follows the Nyingma Order of Tibetan Buddhism.

References

Buddhist monasteries in Sikkim
Nyingma monasteries and temples